This article deals with the diplomatic affairs, foreign policy and international relations of Barbados.

At the political level, these matters are officially handled by the Ministry of Foreign Affairs, which answers to the Prime Minister. The Minister of Foreign Affairs, since May 2018 is Jerome X. Walcott.

Barbados is a moderate political and economic power in the Caribbean region.

Between independence in 1966 and the 1990s, Barbados has used a pro business and investment policy to expand its influence in the world. Through the usage of its network of international bilateral relations, the country has been able to maintain an independent foreign policy. Barbados' recent policy has been to focus and strengthen ties with nations that country feels will enhance its diplomacy or foreign trade. Barbados has sought to engage in multilateral diplomacy through the United Nations, the Caribbean Community (CARICOM), the Association of Caribbean States (ACS), the group of ACP countries, the Organization of American States, and several other agencies which it is engaged. In 2008 Barbados and the other members of CARICOM signed an Economic Partnership Agreement (EPA) with the European Union and its European Commission. The deal covers CARICOM's membership in the Caribbean Forum (CARIFORUM). CARIFORUM in turn is a part of the Group of African, Caribbean, and Pacific (ACP) States. The agreement outlines Barbados' future development and trade ties with the European Union, and serves as a blueprint for future relations between both trading blocs under the Cotonou Agreement and the Lomé Convention.

Barbados has placed an emphasis on a furtherance of relations with the nations of Africa where the majority of islanders have ancestral connection. A prior CARICOM-Africa summit were held with future agenda to be formulated.

As a small nation, the primary thrust of Barbados' diplomatic activity has been within international organisations. Currently Barbados has established official diplomatic relations with 105 countries around the globe.

History
In 1965, Barbados, Antigua and Barbuda, Guyana, and Trinidad and Tobago established the Caribbean Free Trade Association (CARIFTA). Following independence from the United Kingdom in 1966, Barbados went on to become a founding member of many other international organizations.

On 4 July 1973, the founding nations of Barbados, Trinidad and Tobago, Guyana, and Jamaica signed the original Treaty of Chaguaramas in Trinidad thus establishing the Caribbean Community and Common Market (CARICOM). The agreement to establish CARICOM wound up succeeded the CARIFTA organisation. By the following year many of the remaining English-speaking Caribbean states followed suit and also joined CARICOM by May 1974, bring it slowly to the 15 members it has today.

Barbados also is a member of the Caribbean Development Bank (CDB), established in 1970, with headquarters in Wildey, Saint Michael (Bridgetown). The eastern Caribbean's Regional Security System (RSS), which associates Barbados with six nations of the Organisation of Eastern Caribbean States (OECS) is also based in Barbados. In July 1994, Barbados joined the newly established Association of Caribbean States (ACS).

In 2002 the United Nations opened a building in the Marine Gardens area of Hastings found in the Parish of Christ Church the facility simply called the United Nations House acts as a regional operations headquarters for several programmes of the United Nations in Barbados and for many of the other islands in the Eastern Caribbean region.

Countries with diplomatic relations

Barbados has relations with 127 countries around the world:

 – 30 November 1966
 – 30 November 1966 
 – 30 November 1966
 – 30 November 1966
 – 30 November 1966
 – 30 November 1966
 – 30 November 1966
 – 14 March 1967
 – 29 August 1967
 – 29 August 1967
 – 3 October 1967
 – 27 November 1967
 – 6 December 1967
 – 29 February 1968
 – 3 May 1968
 – 16 August 1968
 – 21 November 1969
 – 12 December 1969
 – 30 October 1970
 – 1 March 1971
 – 8 March 1972
 – 26 November 1971
 – 28 January 1972
 – 27 February 1972
 – 6 March 1972
 – 5 August 1972
 – 8 August 1972
 – 11 September 1972
 – 20 September 1972
 – 12 December 1972
 – 10 July 1973
 – 7 January 1974
 – 20 February 1974
 – 3 March 1974
 – 24 April 1974
 – 28 August 1974
 – 14 December 1974
 – 28 August 1975
 – 8 November 1975
 – 18 March 1976
 – 19 March 1976
 – 23 March 1976
 – 5 May 1977
 – 30 May 1977
 – 23 August 1977
 – 11 September 1977 
 – 15 November 1977
 – November 1977
 – 1 December 1977
 – 5 December 1977
 – 1 March 1978
 – 8 March 1978
 – 8 March 1978
 – 23 June 1978
 – 3 November 1978
 – 22 February 1979
 – 9 April 1979
 – 17 April 1979
 – 18 April 1979
 –25 June 1979
 – 20 August 1979
 – 27 October 1979
 – 25 November 1979
 – 4 March 1980
 – 9 September 1980
 – 21 September 1981
 – 1 November 1981
 – 17 December 1981
 – 19 May 1983
 – 19 September 1983
 – 2 February 1984
 – 23 March 1987
 – 22 November 1988 
 – 23 February 1989
 – 30 November 1989
 – 27 January 1992
 – 12 March 1992
 – 6 April 1992
 – 10 April 1992
 – 7 December 1992
 – 29 January 1993
 – 23 March 1993
 – 13 April 1993
 – 27 May 1993
 – 4 January 1994
 – 14 April 1994
 – 18 May 1994
 – August 1994
 – 22 August 1995
 – 25 August 1995
 – 8 January 1996
 – 6 March 1996
 – 13 December 1996
 – 19 December 1996
 – 11 July 1997
 – 3 May 2001
 – 21 October 2005
 – 3 November 2006
 – 20 December 2006
 – 4 December 2007
 – 17 December 2007
 – 18 December 2007
 – 12 March 2008
 – 15 May 2008
 – 15 May 2008
 – 16 March 2009
 – 22 June 2009
 – 18 April 2013
 – 3 September 2014
 – 28 July 2015
 – 19 June 2017
 – 8 March 2018
 – 9 March 2018
 – 27 March 2018
 – 5 December 2018
 – 17 January 2019
 – 26 June 2019
 – 28 June 2019
 – 2 August 2019
 6 August 2019
 – 3 October 2019
 – 8 November 2019
 – 11 November 2019
 – 10 December 2019
 – 10 February 2020
 – 19 February 2020
 – 21 June 2021
 – 22 July 2021
 – 8 December 2021
 – 21 July 2022
 – 17 August 2022
 – 19 September 2022

Bilateral Relations

Africa

Americas

Asia

Europe

Oceania

Bilateral agreements

Reciprocal Promotion and Protection of Investments treaties 

Barbados has a number of Bilateral Investment Treaties (BITs) with a growing list of nations. Some of which include:
Belgium-Luxembourg Economic Union (BLEU) – Signed 29 May 2009
 – Signed: 29 May 1996
 – Signed: 20 July 1998
 – Signed: 19 February 1996
 – Signed: 2 December 1994
 – Signed: 22 April 2008
 – Signed: 25 October 1995
 – Signed: 28 September 2004
 – Signed: 29 March 1995
 – March 1995
 – April 1993
 – July 1994

Double Taxation Agreements 

Barbados has a number of Double Taxation Agreements (DTAs) with a growing list of nations. Some of which include:
 – Signed: 27 February 2006
 – Signed: 23 February 2009
 – Signed: 15 May 2000
 – Signed: 6 July 1994
 – Signed: 17 June 1999
 – Signed: 15 June 1989
 – Signed: 24 April 2008
 – Signed: 5 December 2001
 – Signed: 28 September 2004
 – Signed: 7 April 2008
; Signed: 28 November 2006
; Signed: 19 October 2007
 – Signed: 1 July 1991
 – Extended to Barbados from UK, 1954
– Signed: 18 December 1991
– Signed: 11 December 1998

Ref 1
Ref 2

Multilateral relations

Barbados and the Commonwealth of Nations

Barbados has been a member state of the Commonwealth since 1966, when it became an independent Commonwealth realm and the 27th member state of the Commonwealth.

Barbadians have held various roles within the Commonwealth of Nations such as elections observers, or even more prominently. The country's former Governor-General, Dame Nita Barrow who served on the original Eminent Persons Group of 1985-1986 researched ways to bring about an end of apartheid in South Africa.

Various Commonwealth meetings hosted by Barbados:
 1990 Eleventh Conference of Commonwealth Education Ministers in Bridgetown
 2005 Commonwealth Finance Ministers Meeting
 2010 Ninth Commonwealth Women's Affairs Ministers Meeting

Queen Elizabeth II as Queen of Barbados was viceregally represented by the Governor-General of Barbados until 30 November 2021.

The last Governor-General of Barbados, Dame Sandra Mason was installed in as the first President of Barbados on 30 November 2021 upon Barbados becoming a republic in the Commonwealth of Nations.

United Nations
On 7 December 1966 the Security Council of the United nations met to debate the membership of Barbados to the General Assembly of the United Nations. During the 1487th plenary meeting of 9 December 1966 it was decided that Barbados would be granted membership. Thusly Barbados became the 122nd full member of the United Nations General Assembly on 12 December 1966.

The late Prime Minister Errol Walton Barrow gave a speech during the first General Assembly attended by Barbados: Telling the assembly that his country will be an exponent, "not of the diplomacy of power, but of the diplomacy of peace and prosperity. We have no quarrels to pursue and we particularly insist that we do not regard any member state as our natural opponent," he said. "We will be friends of all, satellites of none."

International Criminal Court
Barbados is also a member of the International Criminal Court, without a Bilateral Immunity Agreement of protection for the US-military (as covered under Article 98)

Diplomatic missions
Barbadian diplomatic missions
Barbados has diplomatic missions headed by resident ambassadors or high commissioners in Canada, the United Kingdom, the United States of America, and Venezuela, and at the European Union (Brussels) and the UN. It also has resident consuls general in Toronto, Miami, and New York City. Australia, Brazil, Cuba, Canada, Colombia, People's Republic of China, Guatemala, the United Kingdom, the United States, and Venezuela have ambassadors or high commissioners resident in Barbados.

Non-Diplomatic Relations

While Barbados has full diplomatic relations with China, it maintains economic and cultural relations with Taiwan via Taipei Economic and Cultural Office in Canada.

Participation in international organisations
ACP • ACCP • ACS • AOSIS • BIS • C • CAF-BDLA • Carib-Export • CARICOM • CARIFORUM • CARTAC • CCJ • CDB • CDERA • CITEL • CTO • CXC • CFATF • CRNM • CROSQ • CSME • ECLAC • FAO • G33 • G77 • IADB • IDB • IAEA • IBRD • ICAO • ICCt • ICFTU • ICJ • ICRM • IDA • IFAD • IFC • IFRCS • ILO • IMF • IMO • Intelsat • Interpol • IOC • IOM • IMPACS • ISO • ITU • LAES • MACHC • MIGA • NAM • OAS • OPANAL • OPCW • PAHO • Revised Treaty of Chaguaramas • RSS • SIDS • UN • UNCTAD • UNESCO • UNHCR • UNIDO • UPU • WCO • WFTU • WHO • WIPO • WMO • UNWTO • WTO

International Fora with Barbados offices
Caribbean Agricultural Research Development Institute (CARDI)
Caribbean Centre for Development Administration (CARICAD)
Caribbean Development Bank (CDB)
Caribbean Disaster Emergency Response Agency (CDERA)
Caribbean Examinations Council (CXC)
Caribbean Export Development Agency (CEDA)
Caribbean Regional Negotiating Machinery (CRNM)
Caribbean Single Market & Economy - Office (CSME)
Caribbean Tourism Organisation (CTO)
CARICOM Regional Organisation For Standards and Quality (CROSQ)
Food and Agriculture Organisation of the United Nations-Sub-Regional Office for the Caribbean(FAO/SLAC)
Inter-American Development Bank (IADB)
Inter-American Institute for Cooperation On Agriculture (IICA)
International Telecommunication Union (ITU)
London Court of International Arbitration (LCIA)
Organisation of American States (OAS)
Pan American Health Organisation (PAHO)
Regional Security Systems (RSS)
United Nations Children's Fund (UNICEF)
United Nations Development Programme (UNDP)
United Nations Development Fund For Women (UNIFEM)

Issues 
 In 2008, Barbados submitted an updated claim to the United Nations Commission on the Limits of the Continental Shelf (UNCLCS) to extend its territorial waters and continental shelf (Exclusive Economic Zone) margins.
Barbados started the process of settlement of maritime boundary with Guyana.
Former Prime Minister Owen Arthur had announced that Barbados would begin to settle its maritime boundaries with France(Martinique).

Disputes - international:
Venezuela, The Barbados Government charged that 1990 Maritime Delimitation Treaty agreement between Trinidad and Tobago and Venezuela extended into its maritime area.

Illicit drugs:
Barbados is one of many Caribbean transshipment points for narcotics bound for the US and Europe

Partially recognized states 

Until 2013, Barbados has recognized the Sahrawi Arab Democratic Republic, when it cancelled relations. In 2018, it recognized Kosovo.

See also
Government of Barbados
List of diplomatic missions in Barbados
List of diplomatic missions of Barbados
List of ambassadors and high commissioners to and from Barbados
Visa requirements for Barbadian citizens

References

External links
Ministry of Foreign Affairs and Foreign Trade
Embassy of the People's Republic of China in Barbados
The European Commission's Delegation to Barbados and the Eastern Caribbean
Economic aspects of sustainable development in Barbados
 - Paper on the EPA (involving) Barbados and the EU's territories
Barbados Hoping To Expand Relations - Barbados P.M. outlines foreign relations plans.